Dona G. Irwin is an American politician and a Democratic member of the New Mexico House of Representatives representing District 32 since January 1999.

Elections
In 1998, Democratic Representative G. X. McSherry left the Legislature and the seat for District 32 open. Irwin ran unopposed in the June 2, 1998 Democratic Primary and won the November 3, 1998 General election with 2,628 votes (61.3%) against Republican nominee Rick Montoya.

Irwin ran unopposed in the 2000 Democratic Primary, winning with 528 votes and won the November 7, 2000 General election with 3,082 votes (65.1%) against Republican nominee Mary Kay Reese.

Irwin ran unopposed in both the 2002 Democratic Primary, winning with 2,283 votes and the November 5, 2002 General election, winning with 4,349 votes.

Irwin ran unopposed in the June 1, 2004 Democratic Primary, winning with 1,056 votes and won the November 2, 2004 General election with 4,063 votes (54.4%) against Republican nominee Ida Kay Chandler.

Irwin and her 2004 Republican challenger Chandler were both unopposed for their June 6, 2006 primaries, setting up a rematch; Irwin won the November 7, 2006 General election with 3,733 votes (61.6%) against Chandler.

Irwin ran unopposed in the June 8, 2008 Democratic Primary, winning with 1,547 votes and won the November 4, 2008 General election with 5,325 votes (74.5%) against Republican nominee Phillip Skinner.

Irwin ran unopposed in the June 1, 2010 Democratic Primary, winning with 1,313 votes and won the November 2, 2010 General election with 3,464 votes (56.9%) against Republican nominee Thomas Walker.

Irwin was challenged in the June 5, 2012 Democratic Primary, winning with 1,309 votes (54.5%) and won the November 6, 2012 General election with 5,688 votes (63.8%) against Republican nominee Thomas Guerra.

References

External links
Official page at the New Mexico Legislature

Dona Irwin at Ballotpedia
Dona G. Irwin at OpenSecrets

Place of birth missing (living people)
Year of birth missing (living people)
Living people
Democratic Party members of the New Mexico House of Representatives
People from Deming, New Mexico
Women state legislators in New Mexico
21st-century American politicians
21st-century American women politicians